Storey County is a county located in the U.S. state of Nevada. As of the 2020 census, the population was 4,104, making it the third-least populous county, but one of the fastest-growing economies in Nevada. In 2018, over 18,000 people were employed in the county. Its area is 264 square miles (680 square kilometers), making it the smallest county in Nevada in terms of area. Its county seat is Virginia City. Storey County is part of the  Reno-Sparks metropolitan area.

History

Storey County was created in 1861 and named for Captain Edward Farris Storey, who was killed in 1860 in the Pyramid Lake War. It was the most populous county in Nevada when organized in 1861. Virginia City is the county seat. It was originally to be named McClellan County after General George B. McClellan, who later ran unsuccessfully against Abraham Lincoln for president in the 1864 election. Storey County benefited from the discovery of Comstock Lode silver.

W. Frank Stewart was a silver-mining operator who served from 1876 to 1880 as a state senator for Storey County.

The county population collapsed after the Comstock Lode was fully mined and hit a minimum of 568 in the 1960 census. Since then, its population has partially recovered because of its relative proximity to Reno.

On September 3, 1999, Kevin Baugh declared his backyard to be independent from the US, creating the Republic of Molossia.

Geography

Major highways

  Interstate 80
  State Route 341
  State Route 342
  State Route 439

Adjacent counties and city
 Washoe County – north
 Lyon County – southeast
 Carson City – southwest

Demographics

2000 census
At the 2000 census, 3,399 people, 1,462 households, and 969 families were living in the county. The population density was 13 people per square mile (5/km2). The 1,596 housing units averaged 6 per square mile (2/km2).  The racial makeup of the county was 93.0% White, 0.3% Black or African American, 1.4% Native American, 1.0% Asian, 0.15% Pacific Islander, 1.7% from other races, and 2.4% from two or more races. About 5.1% of the population was Hispanic or Latino of any race.
Of the 1,462 households, 21.8% had children under the age of 18 living with them, 54.6% were married couples living together, 7.5% had a female householder with no husband present, and 33.7% were non-families. 25.6% of households were one person and 6.9% were one person aged 65 or older. The average household size was 2.32, and the average family size was 2.74.

In the county, the population was distributed as 19.7% under the age of 18, 4.7% from 18 to 24, 26.8% from 25 to 44, 35.7% from 45 to 64, and 13.1% 65 or older. The median age was 44 years. For every 100 females, there were 107.6 males. For every 100 females age 18 and over, there were 103.1 males.

The median income for a household was $45,490 and for a family  was $57,095. Males had a median income of $40,123 versus $26,417 for females. The per capita income for the county was $23,642; 5.8% of the population and 2.5% of families were below the poverty line. Out of the total people living in poverty, 4.2% were under the age of 18 and 4.8% were 65 or older.

2010 census
At the 2010 census, 4,010 people, 1,742 households, and 1,141 families were living in the county. The 1,990 housing units averaged . The racial makeup of the county was 92.1% White, 1.6% Asian, 1.6% American Indian, 1.0% Black or African American, 0.4% Pacific Islander, 1.1% from other races, and 2.2% from two or more races. Those of Hispanic or Latino origin made up 5.7% of the population. In terms of ancestry, 20.9% were German, 20.1% were Irish, 11.5% were English, 7.2% were Italian, and 2.6% were American.

Of the 1,742 households, 23.1% had children under the age of 18 living with them, 53.6% were married couples living together, 7.6% had a female householder with no husband present, 34.5% were non-families, and 26.0% of households were made up of individuals. The average household size was 2.30 and the average family size was 2.76. The median age was 50.5 years.

The median household income was $61,525 and the median family income  was $65,121. Males had a median income of $53,936 versus $34,208 for females. The per capita income for the county was $31,079. About 0.4% of families and 5.6% of the population were below the poverty line, including 2.6% of those under age 18 and 0.0% of those age 65 or over.

Communities
No incorporated communities are in Storey County.

 Clark
 Gold Hill
 Lockwood
 Virginia City (county seat; a census-designated place)
 Virginia City Highlands

Economy
Technology, manufacturing and logistics are the main sectors. In 2010, manufacturing jobs were less than 500, increasing to over 11,000 by 2019, many of them making battery storage. Logistics jobs increased from 1,300 to 4,000 in the same period. In 2014, 5,000 people were working in the county, increasing to over 18,000 by 2018, mostly in the Tahoe Reno Industrial Center. The Tesla Gigafactory 1 has been constructed there.

Storey County has legal prostitution, which provided a significant portion of the tax base. The county is also trying to lure high-technology businesses.

In May 2018, U.S. Treasury Secretary Steven Mnuchin instructed his staff to accept a tract in the county as an opportunity zone under the Tax Cuts and Jobs Act of 2017, though it did not qualify as low-income.  Michael Milken, who had attended several events with and given a private flight to Mnuchin leading up to the designation, was already an investor in the tract.

Politics
Storey County leans towards the Republican Party, with it voting for every Republican since 1980, with the exception being in 1992, when it voted for Independent Ross Perot.

See also

 National Register of Historic Places listings in Storey County, Nevada
 Republic of Molossia – a micronation in southern Storey County
 List of Nevada brothels – Storey County

References

External links
 
 Overview 

 
1861 establishments in Nevada Territory
Populated places established in 1861
Reno, NV Metropolitan Statistical Area